Alamat is a Philippine television drama fantasy animated anthology broadcast by GMA Network. It premiered on July 12, 2015. While the second season premiered on May 15, 2016. The show concluded on June 19, 2016 with a total of 12 episodes. It was replaced by Conan, My Beautician in its timeslot.

The series is streaming online on YouTube.

Production
The first season was directed by Jeffrey John Imutan and features the voices of Pen Medina, Mike Tan, Louise delos Reyes, Tonipet Gaba, Betong Sumaya, Kylie Padilla, Pekto, John Feir, Glaiza de Castro, Gabby Eigenmann, Jeric Gonzales, Bea Binene and Roi Vinzon.

In February 2016, it was announced that it would return for a second season. Jeffrey John Imutan returned as director. Season two's voice actors included Leo Martinez, RJ Padilla, Bianca Umali, Love Añover, Miggs Cuaderno, John Feir, LJ Reyes, Benjamin Alves, Frencheska Farr, Rafa Siguion-Reyna, Tonipet Gaba, and Zymic Jaranilla. It premiered on May 15, 2016.

Episodes
Season 1
 Alamat ng Bayabas (Date: July 12, 2015)  Voice Cast: Pen Medina as Haring Barabas, Jaster Harvey Almoneda as Bunsoy  Additional Voice Cast: Rocky Vil Diga, Charmaine Cordoviz, Ronald Laylo, Marj Dumont
 Ang Kuwento ni Juan Tamad (Date: July 19, 2015)  Voice Cast: Mike Tan as Juan Tamad, Louise delos Reyes as Mariang Masipag, Love Añover as Maria's Mother, Maey Bautista as Juan's Mother Additional Voice Cast: Rocky Vil Diga
 Ang Langgam at ang Tipaklong (Date: July 19, 2015)  Voice Cast: Tonipet Gaba as Larry Langgam, Betong Sumaya as Tony Tipaklong, Milkcah Nacion as Lala, Joshua Uy as Lemuel, Ruth Guhit as Gamu-gamo

Accolades

Ratings
According to AGB Nielsen Philippines' Mega Manila household television ratings, the pilot episode of Alamat earned a 16.2% rating. While the final episode scored a 15.4% rating.

References

External links
 
 

2015 Philippine television series debuts
2016 Philippine television series endings
2010s animated television series
Animation anthology series
Filipino-language television shows
GMA Integrated News and Public Affairs shows
GMA Network original programming
Philippine animated television series
Philippine anthology television series
Philippine children's television series
Philippine drama television series
Philippine fantasy television series
Philippine flash animated television series